The President of the Constitutional Court of Korea is the Chief Justice of the Constitutional Court of Korea. As presiding judge of Full bench composed of nine Justices, the President represents the Constitutional Court of Korea. 

The President of the Constitutional Court of Korea is regarded as one of two equivalent heads of judicial branch in Government of South Korea. Another is Chief Justice of the Supreme Court of South Korea. The equivalent status of the President to the Chief is guaranteed by article 15 of Constitutional Court Act. The current President of the Constitutional Court of Korea is Yoo Nam-seok.

Appointment
Under chapter 6, article 111(4) of Constitution and article 12(1) of Constitutional Court Act, the President of the Constitutional Court of Korea is appointed by the President of South Korea from among the nine Justices of Constitutional Court, with the consent of the National Assembly of South Korea. 

Since the President is selected among nine Justices, and the article 112(1) of Constitution states only as 'term of the Justices shall be renewable six years' yet do not precisely states about exact term length of the President, the Presidents who were newly appointed as both Justice and the President at the same time can serve full six year term, though the Presidents who were appointed while serving as Constitutional Court Justice can only serve remaining of six year term as Justice. It is noteworthy that none of Presidents tried to renew their term because it could harm independence of the Court and judiciary. Under article 7(2) of Constitutional Court Act, President cannot be older than age 70 as other Justices.

Duties
The President's main role is participating in judgment of the Court as one of nine Constitutional Court Justices. According to article 22 of Constitutional Court Act, every cases shall be assigned to the Full bench composed of all nine Constitutional Court Justices in principle. In this case, the President becomes presiding judge following article 22(2) of the Act. However, some of cases can be dismissed in pre-trial stage, due to lack of claim upon which relief can be granted. Whether or not to dismiss in pre-trial stage is called 'prior review' under article 72(1) and 72(3) of the Act and is decided unanimously in Panel which consists of three Constitutional Court Justices respectively. As there are three Panels in the Court, the President also composes one of the Panel.

Another role of the President is supervising judicial administration inside the Court. Since the Constitutional Court of Korea has no lower courts, as it is designed as one and only court to rule important constitutional cases including judicial review, its volume of administration task is smaller than that of Supreme Court Chief Justice. Likewise, the President has no power to intervene in appointment of other Constitutional Court Justices, while the Supreme Court Chief Justice can intervene in appointment by exercising power to recommend candidates for other Supreme Court Justices. This difference attenuates hierarchical aspect inside the Constitutional Court, granting more substantial power on Council of Constitutional Court Justices rather than the President.

 The President serves as Chair at the Council of Constitutional Court Justices, composed of all nine Constitutional Court Justices including the President, which supervises administrative tasks of the Court under article 17 of Constitutional Court Act.

 The President appoints Secretary General and the Deputy of Department of Court Administration with consent of the Council under article 16(4) of Constitutional Court Act, which supervises administrative tasks inside the Court under 17 of the Act.

 The President also appoints every Rapporteur Judges (which has similar role as french Conseiller référendaire) and court officials above grade III with consent of the Council under article 16(4) of Constitutional Court Act. Otherwise, appointment of court officials below grade III does not necessarily require consent of the Council.

 The President present written opinion to the National Assembly, on enacting or revising laws related to administration of the Constitutional Court, under article 10-2 of Constitutional Court Act.

List of Presidents

See also
 Judiciary of South Korea
 Constitutional Court of Korea
 List of justices of the Constitutional Court of Korea
 Rapporteur Judge

References

External links
 Official english website of Constitutional Court of Korea
 CONSTITUTION OF THE REPUBLIC OF KOREA, Korean Law Translation Center, Korea Legislation Research Institute
 CONSTITUTIONAL COURT ACT, Korean Law Translation Center, Korea Legislation Research Institute

Judiciary of South Korea